Gholam-Hossein Naghshineh (‎; 1908 – June 7, 1996) was an Iranian actor and the father of Iranian theatre. He is best known for playing "Uncle" in My Uncle Napoleon ("Dā'i Jān Napoleon)".

External links
 Photograph of Gholam-Hossein Naghshineh: 
 Photograph of Gholam-Hossein Naghshineh's grave: 

1908 births
1996 deaths
People from Tehran
Iranian male film actors
Iranian male stage actors
Iranian male television actors
20th-century Iranian male actors
Burials at artist's block of Behesht-e Zahra